Once a Bum, Always a Dodger: My Life in Baseball from Brooklyn to Los Angeles is a 1990 book by former Major League Baseball pitcher and member of the Baseball Hall of Fame, Don Drysdale and writer Bob Verdi.

References

1990 non-fiction books
English-language books
Major League Baseball books
Sports autobiographies
Brooklyn Dodgers
Los Angeles Dodgers